The Spoils Tournament Experience is the official name of the sanctioned tournament system for The Spoils, a Collectible Card Game created and distributed by Tenacious Games. It will  award over US$1,000,000.00 to top players in tournaments worldwide between October 1, 2006, and the Championship Cruise in winter 2008.

STE points
The core idea behind The Spoils Tournament Experience is that players earn points by competing in and winning sanctioned tournaments. Players can then redeem these points for further prizes, including a room on an upcoming Caribbean cruise on which they can compete in The Spoils World Championship tournament. However, currently, due to financial difficulties, the cruise has been canceled until further notice

Invitationals
Multiple times per year, Invitational tournaments are held to coincide with the pre-release of a new expansion set. These tournaments award STE points and prizes, including enough STE Points for the winner of the tournament to redeem them for a free room on the World Championship Cruise

Invitational qualifiers
The Invitational Qualifier (IQ) system was launched in late 2006. Retail stores can be directly involved in the sanctioned tournament system by running IQ's at the local level. Players can thus learn to play the game, purchase product, and compete in sanctioned play to earn STE Points all in the same location. Additionally, any player that wins a local IQ event is automatically qualified for an upcoming Invitational Tournament.

$13K Series
The Spoils $13k is a series of tournament held in major cities across America. Each tournament awards over US$13,000.00 in addition to other prizes.

History
The Spoils Tournament Experience was officially launched at Gen Con Indy 2006.

STE Invitationals
March 4, 2007

Seasonal championships

2007
Winter Constructed - January 27, 2007
Spring Limited - April 28, 2007
Spring Constructed - June 2, 2007

$13k Series

Convention appearances
Gen Con Indy 2006 - August 10–13, 2006
PAX 2006 - August 26–27, 2006
Gen Con So Cal 2006 - November 16–19, 2007
NY Comic Con 2007 - February 23–25, 2007

Card game competitions
Collectible card games